Matthew 28:20 is the twentieth and final verse of Matthew 28, the twenty-eighth and final chapter of the Gospel of Matthew in the New Testament. This verse is part of the Great Commission narrative.

Content
The original Koine Greek, according to the Textus Receptus and Byzantine/Majority Text, reads as follows:
20: 

In the King James Version of the Bible it is translated as:
20: Teaching them to observe all things whatsoever I have commanded you: and, lo, I am with you always, even unto the end of the world. Amen.

The modern World English Bible translates the passage as:
20: teaching them to observe all things that I commanded you. Behold, I am with you always, even to the end of the age." Amen.

Analysis
The word "all" are found multiple times in the verses 18–20, tying them together: all power/authority, all nations, all things ("that I have commanded you") and all the days ("always").

In , Joshua was commanded to 'go' (cf. Just as Moses, at the end of his life on earth, commissioned Joshua to 'go into the land peopled by foreign nations' and 'to observe all the commandments in the law', then further promised 'God's abiding presence', so similarly is Jesus at the end of his earthly ministry commands his disciples 'to go into all nations' (the world) and 'to teach the observance of all the commandments' of the "new Moses", and then further promises 'his continual assisting presence'.

Matthew's narrative up to this point portrays Jesus as "teacher", but here the verb "teach" is linked to the disciples as the subject, but they are to teach "what Jesus has commanded", not their own ideas. The "commandments" given by Jesus is to be the basis of living for the believers, in comparison to the "commandments" (cognate Greek noun: entolē) given by God through Moses (cf. Matthew 5:19; ;).

"I am with you always" forms an inclusio with the Isaiah's prophecy quoted in Matthew 1:23 that 'they shall name him "Emmanuel", which means, God is with us' (cf. ). 

Uses
The irmos of the ninth ode of the Paschal Canon in the Orthodox Church, which is sung during Pascha and subsequent Matins services, references Matthew 28:20:How noble, O how dear,

How sweet is Thy voice, O Christ.

Thou hast promised to be with us

To the end of all ages.

A promise to which we believers hold,

A promise we hold as an anchor of hope,

As we sing, rejoicing [emphasis added].This hymnological stanza (entitled "Shine, shine" Greek: "Φωτίζου, φωτίζου") originated from the writings of St. John Damascene.

Notes

References

Sources

Matthew 28